Manly Beach is a beach situated among the Northern Beaches of Sydney, Australia, in Manly, New South Wales. From north to south, the three main sections are Queenscliff, North Steyne, and South Steyne.

Etymology
The beach was named by Capt. Arthur Phillip for the indigenous people living there. He wrote, "Their confidence and manly behaviour made me give the name of Manly Cove to this place".

Commercial area
Within walking distance of Manly Beach along the oceanway is Fairy Bower and Shelley Beach. There are shops, restaurants, night clubs, and bars in town.

Patrol
Northern Beaches Council lifeguards operate a year-round service at South Steyne, and operate from October to April at North Steyne and Queenscliff. Volunteer Life Savers also patrol on weekends and public holidays between October and May

Access

Travelling to Manly from Sydney's main ferry terminal, Circular Quay, takes 30 minutes by public ferry. There is also the option of a private ferry from Circular Quay to Manly (and back) between Monday and Saturday. There are two private ferry services running (also called "fast ferries") and the trip takes 18 minutes. The Corso, a pedestrian plaza and one of Manly's main streets for shopping and dining, runs from the ferry wharf and harbour beach, across the peninsula to Manly Beach, where it marks the boundary between North Steyne and South Steyne.

Gallery

References 

 Tourist Information on Manly Beach
 Guide to Sydney Beaches
 "Sand in our Souls – the Beach in Australian History" Leone Huntsman, MUP, 2001

External links 

 Ferry Timetable from Circular Quay (Central Sydney)
Beach Location from SurfingAtlas.com
Destination Manly Local business & tourism guide
Manly Beach Sydney.com's official guide to Manly Beach

Articles containing video clips
Beaches of Sydney
Surfing locations in New South Wales
Manly, New South Wales
Northern Beaches